Sajan may refer to:
 Sajan (director), Indian director of Malayalam movies
 Sajan (Kikinda), a village in Vojvodina, Serbia
 Sajan (1947 film), 1947 Indian film
Sajan (1969 film), Indian Hindi-language film, debut of actor Shatrughan Sinha
 Saajan, 1991 Indian film by Lawrence D'Souza
 Sajan, byname of Indian politician Sunil Singh Yadav